Laurence Cassidy (10 March 1923 – November 2010) was an English footballer who played as a forward. Born in Manchester, he played for Manchester United and Oldham Athletic.

External links
Profile at StretfordEnd.co.uk
Profile at MUFCInfo.com

1923 births
English footballers
Oldham Athletic A.F.C. players
Manchester United F.C. players
2010 deaths
Footballers from Manchester
Association football inside forwards